Paul McEwan is a British actor. He was born in Barnsley in 1970 to Denise and Barry Stephenson. He trained at the Academy of Live and Recorded Arts in London and worked in a call centre to raise funds.

He has had varied television appearances on programmes like Clocking Off, No Angels, Holby City, Casualty, Doctors and Emmerdale for which he is best known as PC Shane Doyle. Since leaving Emmerdale he has appeared as Peter Bleach in the Film "Secret Flight", WPC56 and  Eternal Law. He has also performed in plays with the RSC, Manchester Royal Exchange and the Lyric Hammersmith.

Personal life
McEwan grew up in Sheffield. He worked at BJM/NFO call centre in the late 90s to mid 2000s conducting telephone surveys. Soul-destroying work but we had a laugh sometimes...

References

1970 births
Living people
English male soap opera actors
Male actors from Sheffield
Alumni of the Academy of Live and Recorded Arts